Henry Bryan Ziegler (1798–1874) was a British artist, known as a landscape and portrait painter.

Ziegler studied under John Varley and at the Royal Academy schools. He made a reputation as drawing master to members of the royal family. In later life he mainly painted watercolour portraits. A series of lithographs after Ziegler by Louis Haghe of the lodges of Windsor Great Park was published in 1839, early in the reign of Queen Victoria.

Notes

1798 births
1874 deaths
19th-century British painters
British male painters
British watercolourists
British portrait painters
British landscape painters
19th-century British male artists